Matt Schwartz (born 26 October 1971) is an Israeli-British record producer, songwriter, composer, arranger, programmer, sound engineer, mixing engineer and DJ.

Biography and life
Born in Israel, Schwartz came to London in the early 90s. Schwartz enrolled at Kingston University, and a year later began working at the Hit-House in Hammersmith between 1994 and 1995 with the likes of Farley Jack Master Funk, Dirty Rotten Scoundrels, Matt Jam and Carl Brown, plus many more while producing records with James F. Reynolds.

Schwartz worked at BeatFarm studios in 1996–8, making hundreds of records with the likes of Massive Attack, Arthur Baker, Sara J, Tall Paul, Wamdue Project, JTQ and a host of others while developing unsigned bands and making his own records.

In 1998 Schwartz decided to concentrate on his own career as an artist as well as a producer. In 2000 he started Destined Records for his own output and Blackgold recordings with Gil Goldberg and Sony S2 president Muff Winwood. 
Blackgold had 4 releases amongst them 'Dancing in the dark' by 4tune500 who was an outfit for Matt and Jo Mills which went on to sell 15,000 Vinyls. Destined is highly respected on the underground scene and had a few hits to date including The Drill, DADA and Deepest Blue, his composition of Shooting Star was the theme tune for Sky Sports for 3 years.

As an Electronica producer and artist, Schwartz went on to top dance charts all over the world, his music and songs appearing on numerous TV programs and films (Including blockbusters such as Day of the jackal and The matrix, Sky sports, Fashion TV and most of the UK music TV channels), he cracked the top 10 in several countries and continents selling several million CD singles, Albums, Vinyl, downloads and compilations with a string of international hits under many different names such as M'black, DADA, The Drill, 4tune500 and Deepest Blue all starting their life on his Destined imprint, Matt usually plays all the instruments on his artist records.

In 2009, Schwartz worked with Trevor Horn, Olly Murs Lol Creme (10cc) and Robbie Williams. The following year, Schwartz scored his first No. 1 single in the billboard dance airplay charts with M'black. In 2011, Schwartz topped the Dutch Charts with 'Bang it all' as Dada & Mastiksoul featuring Akon. In 2012, Schwartz was invited to lecture in the WMC in Miami on his experience as a producer and an engineer. Later that year, Schwartz produced and co-wrote Kylie Minogue's "Timebomb". While working under the alias of M'black, in early 2013 he had a number 1 on the US dance charts with the song "Crush".

In 2014, Schwartz co-wrote and co-produced Madison Beer's single "Unbreakable". He produced and co-wrote Cheryl Cole's "Only Human", the song was remixed for radio by drum and bass producer Wilkinson as well as producing and writing for Selah Sue's number 1 Album, Reason, Union J, Ruen Brothers, Holychild, Pitbull & Sophia Del Carmen.

Crossing over from 2014 to 2015 his song "Outlines" by Mike Mago Ft. Dragonette entered at #8 in the UK singles charts. Matt has been working with alternative band All Tvvins on their debut album, their first single "Thank You" becoming song of the week on XFM radio in March 2015
and has been working with NERVO on their debut Album, Collateral, mixing/co-producing several records including "The Other Boys" Ft. Kylie, Jake Shears and Nile Rodgers and Avicci's "You're gonna love again"

On 23 January 2016, "Fear Nothing" by Selah Sue which was co-written and produced by Matt and won the North Vision song contest in Zurich.

In January 2018, he produced songs on Yungblud's EP, "Yungblud" and Peking Duk's "Wasted" on Sony Music Australia, opening at #5 on Spotify's NMF US.

In January 2019, Yungblud released "Loner" and "11 Minutes" with Halsey and Travis Barker which Matt produced and co-wrote. Yungblud's second EP "The Underrated Youth", produced and co-written by Matt, entered the UK Charts at No 6.

In December 2020 YUNGBLUD's Second Album, Weird! which Matt has co produced and co written has topped the UK charts entering the no 1 position in week 51 of the year.

In 2021 Matt Produced and co-written Patience by KSI featuring YUNGBLUD and Polo G which entered the UK Big Top 40 at number one.

2022 saw the release of YUNGBLUD’s third album which Matt co-wrote and produced several songs  on including the singles Tissues  and Don’t feel like feeling sad today. The album topped the charts in 6 countries.

He resides in London and works from his state of the art production facility in the west end.

DJ work
In 2005 Matt took his first step as a DJ performing at the Paris Techno parade to 400,000 people as The Drill.

He has since played many international gigs under his 'The Drill sound system' and 'DADA sound system' and with his Deepest Blue Project.

Number One records

Other singles/Album tracks

Selected Discography 
 1997 Remix 'King of my castle' – Wamdue project Eruption records UK charts No. 1
 1998 Remix 'South of the border'- (Angels release) Robbie Williams 'EMI'
 1998 Co-write 'Dissolved Girl' – Massive Attack (featured on The Matrix) Virgin records UK Charts No. 1 album (Mezzanine)
 1999 Production, co-writer, Instruments – 'A bigger picture' – JTQ Gut Records
 2000 Artist 'Something about you' – TBC Echo records
 2001 Production, co-write 'Intuition' – Dj Encore ft. Engelina Universal Scandinavian chart topping act
 2002 Artist with Jo Mills Dancing in the dark – 4Tune500 Blackgold recordings
 2002 Matt Schwartz Pres. Sholan – "Can You Feel (What I'm Going Through)"
 2003 Nova – "All This Love" – Multiply Records
 2003 Artist With Grant Nelson Bodyswerve – M-Gee Ft. Mica Paris Swing City Club chart No. 1
 2003 Deepest Blue – "Deepest Blue"
 2004 Deepest Blue – "Give it Away"
 2004 Deepest Blue – "Is It A Sin"
 2004 Deepest Blue – "Shooting Star"
 2004 Deepest Blue Album- 'Late September' – Open Records, UK Charts No. 22 Silver Certificate
 2004 Remix  'I Like It {featuring Yvonne John Lewis} Free2Air Recordings UK Charts No. 10
 2005 'The Drill'  – "The Drill"
 2005 'The Drill'  – "One More Night"
 2006 Matt Schwartz & MJ Cole 'Earthlift' – Matt Schwartz and Matt Cole
 2007 Dada feat. Sandy Rivera & Trix – "Lollipop"
 2007 Klark- 'Do Disco'
 2008 Deepest blue-'Miracle'
 2008 'Fall Down' – Nicol Destined Records Feat on ABC's show Army Wives
 2008 'Piano Mano' – The Drill Ft. Firetruck and Antarctica – No 2 Buzz Charts, No 5 Cool Cuts No'1 Download charts
 2008 'Dancing in the dark 08' – 4tune500 4' buzz no' 1 dj download charts
 2008 Producer, co-write, Nicol 'how does it feel now'- ABC Drama Army Wives
 2009 Remixer – Robbie Williams – Bodies
 2009 Dada, Obernik & Harris – "Stereo Flo"
 2009 Co-Writer Lol Cream & Robbie Williams – A million more years
 2010 Producer, co-Writer, Instruments, Mixing – Hyper Crush – 'Flip the Switch' and 'Keep Up' (Mixing, additional instruments co-production)
 2010 Olly Murs – A million More years
 2010 M'Black – Heartbreak Destined Records/Robbins Ent., No. 1 Billboard Hot Dance Airplay, No. 2 Airplay (Internet radio), No. 9 Radio airplay (Dance)
 2011 Dada & Mastiksoul Ft. Akon – 'Bang It All'
 2011 Dada & Rui Da Silva ft One – Crazy Love (Destined Records)
 2012 Dada & Mastiksoul – Forever ft. Nani (Manchester United) No. 1 iTunes Portugal
 2012 Clement Marfo–Mayhem & Champion (Warner) No. 38 UK
 2012 Kylie Minogue-"Timebomb" (EMI) No. 1 in 10 countries including US & UK iTunes (inc video downloads) top 10 in 23 countries
 2012 Dada-Metals
 2012 M'Black – Crush
 2015 Dada, Paul Harris and Dragonette-Red Heart Black [Spinning/Source]

Location timeline
 1981–1984 – Haifa youth philharmonic orchestra
 1990–1993 – Signal Studios, Israel
 1993–1995 – Kingston university Gateway school of music, Kingston upon themes, UK
 1995–1996 – Hit house production house, Hammersmith, UK
 1996–1998 – Beatfarm studios, Waterloo UK
 1998–2001 – Personal Studio, Golders Green, UK
 2009  - Sarm Studios
 2001– present – Destined Studios, Soho recording Studios, West end, UK.

References

External links
 http://www.destined-records.com
 

1971 births
Living people
British record producers
British songwriters
Club DJs
British dance musicians
British Jews
People from Haifa
Mixing engineers